Machate is a surname. Notable people with the surname include:

  (1916–1999), German footballer
 Gottlieb Machate (1904–1974), German chess master
Kevin Machate (1971-), American filmmaker

See also
 Machata

References